The grand finale of the third edition of Miss Diva was held on October 14, 2015. 16 contestants vied for the title and the chance to represent India at the Miss Universe beauty pageant. Urvashi Rautela was crowned Miss Diva 2015, while Natasha Assadi and Naveli Deshmukh were crowned 1st and 2nd Runners Up respectively. The pageant was aired on Romedy Now from 12 October to 18 October 2015. It was also telecast on Zoom and Zee Cafe.

Urvashi Rautela represented India at the Miss Universe 2015 pageant held on December 20, 2015 in the United States.

Results
Color keys

Special Awards

Participants

Finalists

Preliminary round

Judges
 Irrfan Khan, Indian actor
 Kangana Ranaut, Indian actress and model
 Lara Dutta, Indian actress, model and Miss Universe 2000
 Nikhil Mehra, Indian fashion designer
 Shantanu Mehra, Indian fashion designer
 Vikas Bahl, Indian film producer, screenwriter and director

Crossovers & Returnees

Miss Diva
 2021: Naveli Deshmukh (Unplaced)

Femina Miss India
 2019: Shivani Jadhav(Miss India Grand International 2019)
 2015: Naveli Deshmukh(TOP 10)

References

Further reading
 
 
 
 
 
 
 
 

2015 beauty pageants in India
2015 beauty pageants
Miss Diva
October 2015 events in India